César del Campo (1922–2008) was a Cuban film actor.

Selected filmography
 Lola Casanova (1949)
 Confessions of a Taxi Driver (1949)
 Lost (1950)
 The Bandits of Cold River (1956)
 The Empire of Dracula (1967)

References

Bibliography
 Cotter, Bob. The Mexican Masked Wrestler and Monster Filmography. McFarland & Company, 2005.

External links

1922 births
2008 deaths
Cuban male film actors
People from Havana
Cuban emigrants to the United States